The 173rd Pennsylvania House of Representatives District is located in Philadelphia County and includes the following areas:

Ward 41 [PART, Divisions 04, 06, 08, 09, 10, 11, 12, 13, 14, 15, 16, 17, 18, 20, 21, 22, 25 and 26]
Ward 55 [PART, Divisions 04, 05, 07, 26 and 28] 
Ward 65  
Ward 66 [PART, Divisions 02, 07, 11, 17, 24, 29, 30, 32, 35, 36, 37, 42, 43, 44 and 45]

Representatives

References

Government of Philadelphia
173